The 1951–52 Montreal Canadiens season was the club's 43rd season of play. After qualifying for the playoffs in second place, the Canadiens defeated the Boston Bruins to advance to the final series. The Detroit Red Wings would sweep the Canadiens in the finals, four games to none.

Offseason

Regular season

Final standings

Record vs. opponents

Schedule and results

Playoffs

Player statistics

Regular season
Scoring

Goaltending

Playoffs
Scoring

Goaltending

Awards and records

Transactions

See also
1951–52 NHL season

References
Canadiens on Hockey Database
Canadiens on NHL Reference

Montreal Canadiens seasons
Mon
Mon